Louise L. Lambrichs (born 2 May 1952) is a French novelist and essayist.

Lambrichs was born into a family of writers in Boulogne-Billancourt. Her father Georges Lambrichs (along with Jean Paulhan and Jérôme Lindon) was considered one of the greatest French-speaking editors of the second half of the 20th century. Her mother Gilberte Lambrichs who translated the works of Fritz Zorn and Thomas Bernhard wrote under the pseudonym Constance Delaunay.

Lambrichs, who studied philosophy, has published more than a dozen works of which probably the most famous are "Journal d'Hannah" and "Le Jeu du roman".

Then Aruna Villiers directed the film À ton image based on her novel (2004).

In 2005, she published Nous ne verrons jamais Vukovar ("We are never going to see Vukovar"), an analysis of the wars in the former Yugoslavia based on a study of a book by Peter Handke and her own experiences in the field of psychoanalysis.

Bibliography 
 2005: Nous ne verrons jamais Vukovar, novel
 2003: Le cas Handke, conversation à bâtons rompus, novel
 2002: Aloïs ou La nuit devant nous, novel
 2001: Naître... et naître encore, novel 
 2001: 'Chemin faisant, novel
 1998: Les Révoltés de Villefranche mutinerie d'un bataillon de Waffen SS, septembre 1943, co-authored with Mirko D. Grmek
 1998: À ton image, novel
 1995: Le Livre de Pierre, Psychisme et cancer, essay 
 1995: Le jeu du roman, novel
 1993: Journal d'Hannah, novel
 1987: Le Cercle des sorcières, novel
 Grmek : La vie, les maladies et l'histoire (tome 2)
 Mirko D. Grmek, un humaniste européen engagé (tome 1)

External links 
 Louise L. Lambrichs at BiblioMonde.com

1952 births
Living people
People from Boulogne-Billancourt
20th-century French novelists
20th-century French essayists
21st-century French novelists
20th-century French women writers
21st-century French women writers
Prix Renaudot des lycéens winners